Ust-Abakansky District (Khakas: , Ağban piltërë aymağı) is an administrative and municipal district (raion), one of the eight in the Republic of Khakassia, Russia. It is located in the center of the republic. Its administrative center is the urban locality (an urban-type settlement) of Ust-Abakan. Population:  The population of Ust-Abakan accounts for 37.0% of the district's total population.

History
The town of Sorsk used to be administratively under the jurisdiction of the district, but was elevated in status to the town of the republican significance in 2003.

References

Notes

Sources

Districts of Khakassia
